The MV Wenatchee is a  operated by Washington State Ferries. Since delivery, the Wenatchee has almost exclusively been assigned to the busy Seattle–Bainbridge Island route alongside the Tacoma.

Wenatchee has been involved in a couple of notable incidents.  In 2000, during a particularly low tide, she touched bottom while rounding Tyee Shoal at the entrance of Bainbridge Island's Eagle Harbor, resulting in minor keel and propeller damage.  On August 30, 2009, she had a collision with the slip at Colman Dock in Seattle. There was heavy fog at the time and the vessel and slip were out of service for four days.

The Wenatchee and its older sister ship, the Tacoma, suffered from excessive vibration during their early period of operation, until it was repaired during routine maintenance in 1999.

The Jumbo Mark-II fleet is planned to be converted to diesel-electric hybrid beginning in 2021. The conversion is part of a state-mandated reduction in greenhouse gas emissions and will be funded by part of a settlement from the Volkswagen emissions scandal. In April 2021, during sea trials following engine overhauls, the vessel suffered an engine fire and lost power, which led to an ongoing investigation by the US Coast Guard and the National Transportation Safety Board.

Notes

External links 

MV Wenatchee vessel info from WSDOT

Washington State Ferries vessels
1998 ships
Ships built in Seattle
Maritime incidents in 2021
Maritime incidents in 2000
Maritime incidents in 2009